William Prunier (born 14 August 1967) is a French football coach and former player who is currently the manager of Bourges Foot 18.

As a player, Prunier was a centre-back and spent most of his career in France, primarily with Auxerre where he spent nine years, but also played for clubs in England, Denmark, Scotland, Italy, Belgium and Qatar, where he finished his career. He also represented France, gaining his only cap in 1992.

Playing career
Born in Montreuil, Prunier was a product of a famous AJ Auxerre youth team that also included Eric Cantona, Basile Boli, Pascal Vahirua and Daniel Dutuel, all under the tutelage of Guy Roux. After spending many years at Auxerre, he was signed by UEFA Champions League holders Olympique Marseille in 1993. Marseille were relegated to Division 2 the following season due to match-fixing and financial irregularities, and Prunier moved on to FC Girondins de Bordeaux where he won the UEFA Intertoto Cup in 1995 playing alongside Zinedine Zidane. He also earned 1 cap for France in August 1992, a 2–0 loss to Brazil.

In the 1995–96 season, Prunier had a fleeting and forgettable spell at Manchester United. Having bought out his contract with Bordeaux, he joined the Old Trafford club on a trial basis where he was reunited with Cantona. At the time, the manager Alex Ferguson had been looking for a continental-style defender with good passing skills. However, his arrival coincided with an injury crisis that saw the three first-choice centre-backs Steve Bruce, Gary Pallister and David May all unavailable. Prunier was hastily drafted into the first team even though Ferguson had originally intended to use him in reserve team matches only during his trial.

Prunier made his Manchester United debut against Queens Park Rangers on 30 December 1995 partnering Gary Neville in defence. He generally impressed in the match and assisted a goal for Andy Cole as well as hitting a powerful shot against the bar. His second game against Tottenham Hotspur on 1 January 1996, however, was a disaster for him and the club. With Peter Schmeichel injured during the game and Denis Irwin unavailable, he was part of a makeshift defence that conceded four goals in a humiliating loss. Prunier has ever since been made something of a scapegoat for the defeat, culminating in his being voted the sixth worst Manchester United footballer of all time. Despite the defeat, Ferguson offered him an extended trial, but Prunier declined and decided he would look elsewhere.

After leaving Manchester United, Prunier moved on to Copenhagen in Denmark and also had spells at Napoli in Italy and Kortrijk in Belgium before returning to France with Toulouse where he won the Ligue 2 title in 2003. After a brief spell in the United Arab Emirates, he retired from football in 2004 and became a coach at Cannes. On 4 February 2007, he appeared on Sky Sports giving an intro and his point of view on the 4–1 defeat against Tottenham Hotspur in 1996.

Managerial career
Prunier was named head coach of JS Cugnaux in 2010, followed by spells with US Colomiers Football, GS Consolat, Sporting Toulon Var and Canet Roussillon FC. In June 2021 he was appointed assistant coach to manager Cris at Le Mans FC. The duo left the team in May 2022.

On 29 October 2022, Prunier was appointed manager of Championnat National 2 side Bourges Foot 18.

Honours
Bordeaux
UEFA Intertoto Cup: 1995

Individual
Ligue 1 Team of the Year: 2002–03

References

1967 births
Living people
Association football defenders
French footballers
France international footballers
AJ Auxerre players
Olympique de Marseille players
FC Girondins de Bordeaux players
Manchester United F.C. players
F.C. Copenhagen players
Montpellier HSC players
S.S.C. Napoli players
Toulouse FC players
K.V. Kortrijk players
Premier League players
Ligue 1 players
Ligue 2 players
Serie A players
Danish Superliga players
Belgian Pro League players
Expatriate footballers in England
Expatriate footballers in Italy
Expatriate men's footballers in Denmark
Expatriate footballers in Belgium
French expatriate footballers
Al-Sailiya SC players
Sportspeople from Montreuil, Seine-Saint-Denis
French football managers
French expatriate sportspeople in England
French expatriate sportspeople in Denmark
French expatriate sportspeople in Italy
French expatriate sportspeople in Scotland
French expatriate sportspeople in Belgium
French expatriate sportspeople in Qatar
SC Toulon managers
Qatar Stars League players